Saptapadi is a 1992 Indian Kannada-language romantic drama film directed by H. R. Bhargava and based on the novel of the same name by Saisuthe The film stars Ambareesh, Rupini, Sudharani and Anjali Sudhakar. The film, produced by S. A. Srinivas, was widely appreciated for its songs tuned by Upendra Kumar and lead actors performances upon release.

The film's screenplay, dialogues and lyrics are written by Chi. Udaya Shankar. Cinematography is by B. C. Gowrishankar. It was presented by Rajkumar for Sri Vahini Cine Combines.

The director had revealed that originally Rajkumar was supposed to be the hero of the movie which was to be directed by M. S. Rajashekar. However, Rajkumar later felt a younger actor would be an ideal choice for the lead role and decided to only present the movie with Ambareesh in the lead who in turn suggested Bhargava to be the director since their earlier collaboration had been called off.

Cast 
 Ambareesh 
 Rupini
 Sudharani
 K. S. Ashwath
 Anjali Sudhakar
 Abhijeeth
 Ramesh Bhat
 Sundar Krishna Urs
 Sihi Kahi Chandru
 Girija Lokesh
 M. S. Umesh

Soundtrack 
The music of the film was composed by Upendra Kumar and lyrics written by Chi. Udaya Shankar and the entire soundtrack was received extremely well. Audio was released on Sangeetha.

References 

1992 films
1990s Kannada-language films
Indian romantic drama films
Films based on Indian novels
Films directed by H. R. Bhargava
Films scored by Upendra Kumar
1992 romantic drama films